Nudur is a genus of moths in the subfamily Arctiinae. It contains the single species Nudur fractivittarum, which is found in Mexico, Costa Rica and Panama.

References

External links
Natural History Museum Lepidoptera generic names catalog

Lithosiini